This is a survey of the postage stamps and postal history of the United Arab Emirates (UAE).

Early mails  
The first post office in the region was opened in Dubai in 1909. Dubai had one post office which was Indian in origin, under the Sind circle, and opened on 19 August 1909. Until 1947, Indian stamps were in use and are distinguished by the cancellation "Dubai Persian Gulf". Pakistani stamps were used until 31 March 1948.

British postal agencies in Eastern Arabia 

Britain managed the Trucial States' external relations (a result of the 1892 'Exclusive Agreement' treaty), including the management of posts and telegraphs - the states were not members of the UPO - the Universal Postal Union). The Government of India opened its first post office in Dubai in 1941 and its operation was taken over by British Postal Agencies, a subsidiary of the GPO (General Post Office) in 1948. Stamps of the time were British stamps surcharged with Rupee values, until in 1959 a set of 'Trucial States' stamps was issued from Dubai.

Following the Partition of India, the British postal agencies in Eastern Arabia were established. The British agency stamps issued in Muscat were sold in Dubai until 6 January 1961. The agency issued the Trucial States stamps on 7 January 1961.

In Abu Dhabi, an agency was opened on Das Island in December 1960 and in Abu Dhabi City on 30 March 1963, using British agency stamps issued in Muscat. The Trucial States stamps were not used in Abu Dhabi.

As each emirate took over its own postal administration, the offices closed: Dubai on 14 June 1963; Abu Dhabi on 29 March 1964.

The northern emirates proceeded to issue a number of editions of stamps intended for the collector's market - particularly Ajman, Umm Al Quwain and Sharjah. Known today as Dunes, they are colourful and virtually worthless.

First Emirati stamps 
The UAE issued its first Federal stamps on 1 January 1973. Before then, the individual emirates issued their own stamps.

See also 
Dunes (stamps)
British postal agencies in Eastern Arabia
Postage stamps and postal history of Abu Dhabi
Postage stamps and postal history of Sharjah
Revenue stamps of the United Arab Emirates

References 
Notes

Citations

External links
The Emirates Philatelic Association جمعية الإمارات لهواة الطوابع 
 The Emirates Post  مجموعة بريد الإمارات 
 The Emirates Post Shop متجر بريد الإمارات 

Philately of the United Arab Emirates